Frontier Vengeance is a 1940 American Western film directed by George Sherman and written by Barry Shipman and Bennett Cohen. The film stars Don "Red" Barry, Betty Moran, George Offerman Jr., Ivan Miller, Obed 'Dad' Pickard and Cindy Walker. The film was released on October 10, 1940, by Republic Pictures.

Plot

Cast 
Don "Red" Barry as Jim Sanders
Betty Moran as Ruth Hunter
George Offerman Jr. as Clay Blackburn
Ivan Miller as Frank Blackburn
Obed 'Dad' Pickard as Rocky
Cindy Walker as Singer Cindy
Kenneth MacDonald as Slash
Griff Barnett as Joel Hunter
Yakima Canutt as Henchman Zack
Jack Lawrence as Henchman Moyer
Matty Roubert as Henchman Pinto
Fred Toones as Snowflake

References

External links
 

1940 films
1940s English-language films
American Western (genre) films
1940 Western (genre) films
Republic Pictures films
Films directed by George Sherman
American black-and-white films
1940s American films